The Carolina Monarchs were a short-lived ice hockey team in the American Hockey League.  They played in Greensboro, North Carolina, at the Greensboro Coliseum, succeeding the ECHL Greensboro Monarchs, some of whose owners accepted an expansion proposal from the AHL to start play in the 1995-96 season.

Just two seasons later, though, the Hartford Whalers of the NHL announced that they would play in the Greensboro Coliseum for the 1997-98 and 1998-99 seasons as the newly named Carolina Hurricanes, awaiting their permanent home arena's construction in Raleigh. The NHL team purchased the dethroned Monarchs, moving the franchise to New Haven, Connecticut, where the team played as the Beast of New Haven.

History
The market was previously served by:
 Carolina Thunderbirds/Winston-Salem Thunderbirds (ACHL, AAHL, ECHL) (1981–1992)
 Greensboro Monarchs (ECHL) (1989–1995)
The market was subsequently home to:
 Greensboro Generals (ECHL) (1999–2004)
 Carolina Hurricanes (NHL) (1997–1999)

Season-by-season results
 Carolina Monarchs 1995–1997
 Beast of New Haven 1997–1999

References

External links
Team History at HockeyDB.com

 
Ice hockey teams in North Carolina
Defunct ice hockey teams in the United States
Defunct American Hockey League teams
Ice hockey clubs established in 1995
Sports clubs disestablished in 1997
Florida Panthers minor league affiliates
1995 establishments in North Carolina
1997 disestablishments in North Carolina